Sultan Muwalill Wasit II was the Sultan of Sulu. He was murdered November 21, 1936. 

He was the younger brother of Sultan Badarud-Din II and Sultan Jamalul-Kiram II and Raja Muda (crown prince) of the Sultanate. He was lawfully elected by the Ruma Bichara, the Datus and Sharifs as the new Sultan. Six months later and before the formal coronation ceremony took place, he was murdered. His legitimacy as the heir to the throne and his position as crown prince of Jamalul-Kiram II was confirmed again by the Sessions Court of North Borneo's so-called McKaskie court ruling in 1939, identifying his heirs as the rulers of the territory of North Borneo. Mohammed Esmail Kiram I was the eldest son of Muwallil Wasit II and recognised successor of the Sultan of Sulu.

References

External links
 Line of Succession of the Sultans of Sulu of the Modern Era, published by the Official Gazette of the Government of the Philippines  

Year of birth missing
1936 deaths
History of Sulu
Sultans of Sulu